Shaunt Basmajian (30 September 1950 – 25 January 1990) was a Canadian poet and author.

He was a co-founder of Old Nun Publications and was a member of the Parliament Street Library poetry group.

In 1986, he was attacked with a knife and robbed while he was driving a taxi. His right lung was punctured when a robber stabbed him. He died one year later when his heart lining collapsed.

Bibliography

 1982: Surplus Waste and Other Poems 
 1985: Poets Who Don't Dance  1985
1988: Biased Analogies

References

External links 
Records of Shaunt Basmajian are held by Simon Fraser University's Special Collections and Rare Books

1950 births
1990 deaths
Writers from Beirut
20th-century Canadian poets
Canadian male poets
20th-century Canadian male writers